The 1998 Five Nations Championship was the sixty-ninth series of the rugby union Five Nations Championship. Including the previous incarnations as the Home Nations and Five Nations, this was the hundred-and-fourth series of the northern hemisphere rugby union championship. Ten matches were played over five weekends from 7 February to 5 April. France won it with a Grand Slam. England had the consolation of winning the Triple Crown, the Calcutta Cup and the Millennium Trophy.

Participants
The teams involved were:

Squads

Standings

Results

Week 1

 Ireland head coach Brian Ashton resigned on 20 February, being replaced by Warren Gatland, who was appointed on 24 February.

Week 2

Week 3

Week 4

Week 5

References

1998 rugby union tournaments for national teams
1998
1997–98 in European rugby union
1997–98 in Irish rugby union
1997–98 in English rugby union
1997–98 in Welsh rugby union
1997–98 in Scottish rugby union
1997–98 in French rugby union
Five Nations
Five Nations
Five Nations